The Native American Literature Symposium (NALS) is a Native American literature conference. It was founded in 2001. It is held at a tribal venue every spring. The NALS was first established by a group of independent scholars committed to creating a place where Native voices can be heard. The current director is Gwen N. Westerman of Minnesota State University, Mankato.

Past speakers and special appearances
Since 2001, the NALS has brought in some voices and groups in Native America, specializing in areas such as: art, prose, poetry, film, religion, history, politics, music, philosophy, and science. Past guest speakers include:

Heid Erdrich
Linda Grover
LeAnne Howe
Simon Ortiz
Santa Fe Indian School Spoken Word Program

References

External links

Academic conferences
First Nations literature
Native American literature